Suski is a surname. Notable people with the surname include: 

Andrzej Suski (born 1941), Polish Roman Catholic prelate
Augustyn Suski (1907–1942), Polish poet
Leszek Suski (1930–2007), Polish fencer
Marek Suski (born 1958), Polish politician
Marian Suski (1905–1993), Polish fencer and engineer